Stade de l'Épopée is a stadium in Calais, France.  It is currently used for football matches and is the home stadium of Régional 1 club Grand Calais Pascal FC.  The stadium holds about 12,000 spectators.

The first game played at the stadium was a 4–1 win for Stade Lavallois over former tenants Calais RUFC on 27 September 2008.

References

External links
Stadium information

Calais RUFC
l'Epopee
Sports venues in Pas-de-Calais
Sport in Calais
Sports venues completed in 2008
Buildings and structures in Calais
21st-century architecture in France